Vonds Ichihara (VONDS市原) is a Japanese football club based in Ichihara, Chiba. The club plays in the first division of Kantō Soccer League, which is part of the Japanese Regional Leagues.

History 
Founded in 1967, the club was tied with Furukawa Electric Company. In 1986, they had a moment of glory by winning the 22nd Shakaijin Cup.

After changing the name in 2008 to SAI Ichihara Football Club, it was again renamed in 2011, to Vonds Ichihara Football Club. The name "Vonds" came from the word "bond" in English, changing though the initial letter to "V", which is a link to victory. The club is aiming to become a Japan Football League member and reaching professional football from there, as former parent club JEF United Ichihara Chiba is no longer considered to represent Ichihara.

Changes in club name 
1967–2008: Furukawa Electric Chiba SC
2008–2010: SAI Ichihara Football Club
2011–present: Vonds Ichihara Football Club

League record 

Key
{{smalldiv|1=
Pos. = Position in league; P = Games played; W = Games won; D = Games drawn; L = Games lost; F = Goals for; A = Goals against; GD = Goal difference; Pts = Points gained
 ‡ Competition cancelled due to COVID-19 pandemic in Japan}}

 Honours 
All Japan Shakaijin Cup
Winners (1): 1987
 Kantō Soccer League 
Champions (2): 2017, 2019
Chiba Prefecture Adult Soccer League Division 1
Champions (1) 2012

 Current squad Updated to 14 October 2022''.

References

External links 
Official site
Official Facebook page
Official Twitter account
Official blog

Football clubs in Japan
Japan Soccer League clubs
Sports teams in Chiba Prefecture
Association football clubs established in 1967
1967 establishments in Japan